Xenophon  was a Greek soldier, historian and philosopher in the 4th century BC. 

Xenophon may also refer to:

People

Other ancient people
 Xenophon of Corinth, an Olympic runner in 464 BC
 Xenophon (son of Euripides), an Athenian general in the 430s BC
 Xenophon of Aegium, the name of two Olympic athletes from the same Greek city, victorious in 380 BC and 60 BC
 Xenophon of Lampsacus, a Greek geographer from the 2nd century BC
 Gaius Stertinius Xenophon, a Roman physician (c. 10 BC-54 AD)
 Xenophon of Ephesus, a Greek writer from the 2nd or 3rd century AD
 Claudius Xenophon, a Roman governor in Britain in the 3rd century AD

Modern people with the name
Given name
Xenophon Hicks (1872-1952) United States Circuit Judge
Xenophon Huddy (1876–1943), Automotive Law Specialist
Xenophon Overton Pindall (1873–1935), governor of Arkansas
Xenophon P. Wilfley (1871–1931), Missouri politician
Xenophon Zolotas (1904–2004), Greek economist
Dana Xenophon Bible (1891–1980), American football player and coach

Surname
Nick Xenophon (born 1959), Australian politician

Astronomical features
 Xenophon (crater), a small lunar crater
 5986 Xenophon, a main-belt asteroid